Ittihad Al-Ramtha is a Jordanian football club based in Ramtha, Jordan.

Current squad

Current technical staff

Kit Providers
Adidas

External links
Jordan - Ittihad Al Ramtha Club - Results, fixtures, squad, statistics, photos, videos and news - Soccerway
Jordan - Ittihad Al Ramtha - Results, fixtures, tables, statistics - Futbol24
فريق: اتحاد الرمثا
نادي اتحاد الرمثا Ittihad Ramtha FC

References

Football clubs in Jordan
Association football clubs established in 1990
1990 establishments in Jordan